Stuyvesant Cove Park is a  public park on the East Side of the New York City borough of Manhattan that runs from 18th Street to 23rd Street between the FDR Drive and the East River. Part of the East River Greenway, it is located to the south of the Waterside Plaza apartment complex, to the east of Stuyvesant Town–Peter Cooper Village, and to the north of the East River Park, and connects to the Captain Patrick J. Brown Walk on the south end.

Background
Located on the former brownfield site of a cement plant and a parking lot, the park was created after the failure of the proposed Riverwalk mixed-use development that would have included residential units, offices, a hotel and a marina. Surplus cement dumped from trucks into the East River has created a small beach in the middle of the park near the end of 20th Street, which is not intended to be accessed by pedestrians.

The park, which was completed in 2002, cost $8.3 million and was designed by Donna Walcavage Landscape Architecture. Solar 1, an environmental learning center with a small outdoor stage for public performances, is located at the north end of the park.

The park features a number of gazebos and a bike path along with ample bike parking.  There are several picnicking areas with tables and seating.

Since 2009, Stuyvesant Cove Park has been artfully planted with a wide variety of native plant species. In 2018, park manager Emily Curtis-Murphy embarked on a program to showcase plant species originally native to Manhattan and Long Island in a manner that positions the park as an outdoor classroom for students attending local schools.

Transportation
Stuyvesant Cove is served by NYC Ferry's Soundview route.

Native Plants of Stuyvesant Cove Park
As of 2016, these are the native plant species that vegetate at the park:

References
Notes

External links

 Stuyvesant Cove Park Association
 Stuyvesant Cove Park - Solar One

East River
Kips Bay, Manhattan
Manhattan Waterfront Greenway
Parks in Manhattan
Urban public parks
23rd Street (Manhattan)
Protected areas established in 2002
2002 establishments in New York City
Stuyvesant family